Twin Falls Christian Academy is a private Christian school in Twin Falls, Idaho. This school opened in 1975.  It is a ministry of Grace Baptist Church.

References

Baptist schools in the United States
Christian schools in Idaho
Private high schools in Idaho
Schools in Twin Falls County, Idaho
Private elementary schools in Idaho
Private middle schools in Idaho
1975 establishments in Idaho